Sermphan Khumthinkaew (Thai เสริมพันธ์ คุ้มถิ่นแก้ว  ), is a Thai futsal Defender, and currently a member of  Thailand national futsal team.

He competed for Thailand at the 2004 and 2008 FIFA Futsal World Cup finals.

References

Sermphan Khumthinkaew
1981 births
Living people
Sermphan Khumthinkaew
Southeast Asian Games medalists in futsal
Competitors at the 2011 Southeast Asian Games
Sermphan Khumthinkaew